Kulturdenkmal is the official term to describe National Heritage Sites listed by law in German-speaking areas of Europe, to protect and spread awareness of cultural heritage.

Austria
In Austria, the Bundesdenkmalamt (BDA), the institution in charge of the National Heritage Sites, administers the list of Kulturdenkmal objects, which it formally refers to as Denkmalgeschützte Objekte.

Belgium
The Institut du Patrimoine is the institution in charge of the National Heritage Sites of Wallonia, which includes the National Heritage Sites of the German-speaking Community of Belgium. Various local websites with public information are maintained, and  various initiatives are undertaken to assist owners of protected properties and to increase public awareness, most notably the European Heritage Days, which are called "Tage des offenen Denkmals".

Germany
As cultural matters lie largely within the responsibility not of the national government, but of the 16 states (Bundesländer), the 16 respective heritage protection authorities (Landesdenkmalämter) survey and list official monuments.

Switzerland

The Kulturgüterschutz is the institution in charge of the National Heritage Sites of the German-speaking areas of Switzerland. They maintain the inventory of protected objects and also organize the European Heritage Days, which are called Europäischer Tag des Denkmals.

Emblems

References

 
Heritage organizations
German words and phrases